Acrolophitus is a genus of North American grasshoppers in the family Acrididae.

Species include:
Acrolophitus hirtipes
Acrolophitus maculipennis    
Acrolophitus nevadensis 
Acrolophitus pulchellus

References 

Acrididae genera
Taxonomy articles created by Polbot
Gomphocerinae